Tim Golden was a member of the Georgia State Senate, representing the 8th District from January 11, 1999, to January 12, 2015. He was a member of the Georgia House of Representatives from 1990 to 1998.

Party Switch

On November 28, 2010, he announced his switch from Democrat to Republican.

References

External links
 Georgia Legislature – Senator Tim Golden official government site
 Project Vote Smart – Senator Tim Golden (GA) profile
 Follow the Money – Tim Golden
 2006 2004 2002 2000 1998 1996 campaign contributions

Republican Party Georgia (U.S. state) state senators
Republican Party members of the Georgia House of Representatives
Valdosta State University alumni
Year of birth missing (living people)
Living people
21st-century American politicians